Luann Marie Ryon (January 13, 1953 – December 27, 2022) was an American archer who won a gold medal at the 1976 Summer Olympics in Montreal, Quebec.

Ryon was the second American to win Olympic gold in Women's Individual Archery. No American woman has won an Olympic medal in the event since. Ryon also earned world archery championships in 1976, 1977, 1978, and 1982.  

Ryon died on December 27, 2022, at the age of 69.

References

External links
 

1953 births
2022 deaths
American female archers
Archers at the 1976 Summer Olympics
Olympic gold medalists for the United States in archery
Sportspeople from Long Beach, California
World Archery Championships medalists
Medalists at the 1976 Summer Olympics
Pan American Games medalists in archery
Pan American Games gold medalists for the United States
Pan American Games silver medalists for the United States
Archers at the 1983 Pan American Games
Medalists at the 1983 Pan American Games
21st-century American women